Stigmella alaurulenta is a moth of the family Nepticulidae. It is only known from Honshu in Japan.

Adults were found in mid-May. There are probably two or more generations per year.

The larvae feed on Malus sieboldii. They mine the leaves of their host plant.

External links
Japanese Species Of The Genus Stigmella (Nepticulidae: Lepidoptera)

Nepticulidae
Moths of Japan
Moths described in 1985